Acrolophus whitelyi is a moth of the family Acrolophidae first described by Hamilton Herbert Druce in 1901. It is found in Guyana.

The head, thorax and abdomen are pale brown and the antennae and palpi are yellowish brown. The forewings are yellowish brown, with a large, central, V-shaped, reddish-brown mark extending across the middle of the wing from the costal to the inner margin. The costal margin and the outer margin are striated with reddish brown and there is a reddish-brown dot on the inner margin close to the base. The hindwings are blackish brown.

References

Moths described in 1901
whitelyi